1st Born Second is the debut album by the American singer-songwriter Bilal, released on July 27, 2001, by Interscope Records. Bilal recorded the album at Electric Lady Studios in New York with a host of record producers, including Aaron Comess, Dr. Dre, Mike City, Megahertz, Raphael Saadiq, and J Dilla. It was a critical success and charted at number 31 on the U.S. Billboard 200, eventually selling 319,000 copies. According to AllMusic biographer Andy Kellman, the album was an "exemplary" release of the retro-inspired neo soul genre, although Bilal's subsequent work would become increasingly distinctive and modern.

Background

Bilal developed an interest in singing while growing up in the Germantown area of Philadelphia, where he participated in a church choir at the behest of his Baptist mother. On occasional trips to the city's jazz clubs with his father, he witnessed the working habits and lifestyles of musicians, which inspired him to pursue music seriously. Starting as a vocal student at the Philadelphia High School for the Creative and Performing Arts, Bilal advanced to studying the music theory and language shared by the instrumentalist students so he could socialize with them.

In 1999, Bilal went to New York City to train at the New School for Jazz and Contemporary Music, where he developed a reputation among his peers for challenging their musical sensibilities. He also frequented the city's Wetlands Preserve nightclub and met members of the Soulquarians (including Common, The Roots, and Erykah Badu), a rotating collective of experimental black music artists who often collaborated on each other's recordings. A demo recorded with the musician Aaron Comess, who Bilal met at a jam session set up by New School professors, earned the singer a recording contract from Interscope Records and encouraged his exit from the school to concentrate on music professionally. His performance at a 1999 Prince tribute concert generated much buzz in the music industry.

Recording and music 

After signing to Interscope in 1999, Bilal wrote songs and improvised with a band at a warehouse in New Jersey in preparation for the album's recording, which took place at Electric Lady Studios in New York around 1999 and 2000. In December 1999, while reviewing Bilal's Prince tribute performance at the Brooklyn Academy of Music, The Village Voice reported that the album was expected by Spring of next year. However, the release encountered delays as Interscope pressured the singer into collaborating with more popular record producers, including Dr. Dre and Soulquarians member J Dilla, who helped refine Bilal's stylistically-varied and free-form approach into more structurally-defined songs to the label's liking. This process extended the recording for approximately another year. Comess participated in the recording as a bassist, drummer, producer, and engineer. The Soulquarians also contributed production.

1st Born Second features an eclectic sound with elements of jazz, hip hop, scat, reggae, and rock music. According to Mark Anthony Neal, its title originates from the idea that Bilal is the "first born prodigal son of the second generation of contemporary soul stirrers", referring to the group of artists associated with the neo soul movement. The singer's name also serves as an acronym for "Beloved, Intelligent, Lustful and Livin' It".

Critical reception

1st Born Second was met with widespread critical acclaim. At Metacritic, which assigns a normalised rating out of 100 to reviews from professional publications, the album has an average score of 82, based on 17 reviews.

The album received rave reviews from The Village Voice, Chicago Sun-Times, and USA Today, and it also received comparisons to the music of Marvin Gaye, Stevie Wonder, Sly & the Family Stone, Prince, and Curtis Mayfield. Reviewing for PopMatters, Neal hailed the album as "one of the most significant debuts in black pop during the past 25 years". Vibes Tamika Andeson called it "one of the best R&B albums of the year". According to AllMusic's Andy Kellman, "at that point, the closest points of comparison were D'Angelo and Maxwell, yet Bilal was more dynamic than the former and less mannered than the latter. 1st Born Second carried an energy that neither one of those singers, as hot as they were at the time, could boast."

Some reviewers were less impressed. Spin magazine's Tony Green said that the album is musically expansive but lacking "that killer tune or two that would bring it all home, that one memorable melody that would make the album more than the sum of its incense 'n' dreads textures". In an essay accompanying the Pazz & Jop critics poll, in which 1st Born Second finished in the top 100, Robert Christgau named Bilal among the "profusion of R&B also-rans" that he hopes "will develop material nobody can deny".

Track listing
Information is taken from the album's liner notes.

Charts

Personnel
Credits are taken from AllMusic.

 Bilal – vocals, drums, clavier, producer
 Dr. Dre – producer
 Greg Burns – assistant engineer, mixing
 Larry Chatman – project coordinator
 Mike City – multi instruments, producer
 Aaron Comess – bass, drums, producer, engineer, mixing engineer
 Tom Coster, Jr. – keyboards
 Jim Danis – assistant engineer, mixing
 Dahoud Darien – producer
 Vidal Davis – producer, engineer
 Russell Elevado – mixing
 Mike Elizondo – guitar, keyboards
 Todd Farrell – assistant engineer
 Drew FitzGerald – art direction
 Serban Ghenea – guitar, mixing
 Robert Glasper – keyboards, keyboard accordion
 James Hurt – string arrangements
 Jay Dee – producer
 Gintas Janusonis - drums, percussion
 Andres Levin – engineer, mixing
 Steve Mandel – mixing
 Artemio Villeda Martín – executive producer
 Alan Mason – mixing
 Sid McCoy – narrator
 Mel-Man – keyboards, producer
 Peter Mokran – mixing engineer
 Mike Moreno – guitar
 Mos Def – rap
 Damu Mtume – executive producer
 Neil Pogue – mixing engineer
 James Poyser – organ, producer, Fender Rhodes
 Raphael Saadiq – producer
 Jon Smeltz – engineer
 Soulquarians – producer
 Mike Starr – guitar
 Kendal Stubbs – engineer
 John Tyree – assistant engineer, mixing

References
Footnotes

Bibliography

External links
 

2001 debut albums
Albums produced by Dr. Dre
Albums produced by Dre & Vidal
Albums produced by J Dilla
Albums produced by Questlove
Albums produced by Raphael Saadiq
Albums produced by James Poyser
Interscope Records albums
Bilal (American singer) albums
Albums produced by Mike City
Albums produced by Melvin "Mel-Man" Bradford
Albums recorded at Electric Lady Studios